Belém is one of 96 districts in the city of São Paulo, Brazil. Although administratively part of the Southeast Zone of São Paulo, Belém is located slightly northeast of the historic downtown in the subprefecture of Mooca.

References

Districts of São Paulo